Yacine Bourhane (born 30 September 1998) is a professional footballer who plays for Danish club Esbjerg fB as a midfielder. Born in France, Bourhane represents the Comoros national team.

Club career
Bourhane started his career with French side Chamois Niortais. He made his Ligue 2 debut on 16 October 2017, coming on as a substitute for Tom Lebeau in the 0–0 draw with Lorient. He signed for Go Ahead Eagles in July 2021.

On 31 January 2022, Bourhane joined Danish 1st Division club Esbjerg fB on a deal until the end of 2024.

International career
Born in France, Bourhane is of Comorian descent. Bourhane debuted for the Comoros national team in a 2–1 friendly win over Libya on 11 October 2020.

He was included in the Comoros' 2021 Africa Cup of Nations squad.

Career statistics

References

External links
 
 
 

Living people
1998 births
Footballers from Seine-Saint-Denis
People from Noisy-le-Grand
French sportspeople of Comorian descent
Citizens of Comoros through descent
Comorian footballers
Comorian expatriate footballers
French footballers
Comoros international footballers
2021 Africa Cup of Nations players
Association football midfielders
US Torcy players
Chamois Niortais F.C. players
Go Ahead Eagles players
Esbjerg fB players
Ligue 2 players
Championnat National 3 players
Eredivisie players
Comorian expatriate sportspeople in the Netherlands
Expatriate footballers in the Netherlands
Expatriate men's footballers in Denmark